Laura Sibilia is an American politician who serves as a member of the Vermont House of Representatives from the Windham-Bennington district as an independent.

Early life and education

Sibilia is the eldest of twelve children. She graduated from Whitingham High School, Champlain College with a degree in hotel restaurant management, and the Massachusetts College of Liberal Arts with a Master of Arts degree in English and communications. Sibilia married TJ, with whom she had three children. She was first elected to the Dover School board in 2003, and also served on the River Valleys School District board.

Vermont House of Representatives

Sibilia defeated Representative John Moran, a Democratic member of the Vermont House of Representatives, and independent candidate Phil Gilpin in the 2014 election as an independent. She defeated Moran in the 2016 election, faced no opposition in the 2018 election, and defeated Republican nominee Matthew Somerville in the 2020 election.

She serves on the Ethics Panel, as vice-chair of the Energy and Technology committee, and as chair of the Joint Information Technology Oversight committee. Sibilia served on Governor Phil Scott's transition team in 2016.

Political positions

Sibilia sponsored legislation to implement ranked voting in 2019, stating that it "guarantees the will of the majority and encourages more people to step into politics". She initially voted against the legalization of marijuana, but later voted in favor of it due to a commission which she felt would help prepare for marijuana sales in Massachusetts. The Vermont Conservation Voters gave her a lifetime score of 63%.

Electoral history

References

External links

21st-century American women politicians
21st-century American politicians
Champlain College alumni
Living people
Massachusetts College of Liberal Arts alumni
Members of the Vermont House of Representatives
Vermont Independents
Women state legislators in Vermont
Year of birth missing (living people)